The University of Sydney plays host to a wide variety of comedy revues each year, each typically tied to a faculty or identity group. Each revue features comedy sketches, songs and videos written and performed by students, usually commenting satirically on current affairs, the supporting faculty and general student life.

The Revues are casual student production, and as such are prone to production issues, such as when Engineering Revue was infamously saved in 2015 by a group of past-performers sourced from multiple revues whom put together a show in 2 days after the original cast fell through. The show trended across the country.

Most of the revues are performed in the Seymour Centre on the university's Darlington campus. Tickets range between $10 to $25 dollars, with various discounts for students. The revues are produced and sponsored by the University of Sydney Union (USU) and presented in a collective "season". The Revues range in budget and cast size, with the Faculty Revues using larger venues, and higher budgets as a result of Faculty funding.

Past revuers have gone on to perform, write and produce shows in the Edinburgh Fringe Festival, the New York Fringe Festival, the Melbourne International Comedy Festival, the Adelaide and Melbourne Fringe Festivals, in groups such as The Chaser, The Aunty Jack Show, The Ronny Johns Half Hour, The Axis of Awesome, Ben Jenkins & The Delusionists, and the Cloud Girls on triple j.

History 
Revues at USYD began with a single "USYD Revue", which then expanded to additional shows in the 1960s, with 13 revues performing in 2017. The original four Faculty revues were made up of students from Medicine, Law, Architecture and Engineering.

Of the revues, the largest are the Arts Revue, Science Revue, Med Revue and Law Revue. Engineering Revue has been staged in Manning Bar since 2006, and Commerce Revue made its debut in 2008. A Pharmacy Revue was planned for 2009, but was cancelled/postponed. The growing number of faculty revues has led to certain revues developing their own individual character, such as the Science Revue, which is known less for science specific humour, and instead for the work of its distinct troupes of singers, dancers and band, who work alongside the actors.

Since 2013 a Best Of show, usually named University of Sydney Revue, has been staged as a part of the Sydney Comedy Festival, which is composed of the best performers and scenes from the previous season.

With Womn's Revue first performed in 2007, and Queer Revue in 2010, the set of Identity Revues has expanded in recent years with productions including Jew Revue, POC Revue and International Revue. From 2016 onwards, a separate, earlier Revue Season was created for the Identity Revues during the first semester of the university calendar.

The popularity of revues saw a decrease, with steady drops in ticket sales recorded in 2016 from the past few years. Lockdowns in 2020 resulted in an almost non existent 2020 revue season, which put strain on revues such as International Revue, which dissolved as a society in 2022.

Faculty Revues

Science Revue 
The Science Revue debuted in its current iteration in 2006. The Revue is best known for having a large cast, with 92 cast members in the 2008 production. This has led to the development of distinct troupes (Acting, Singing, Dancing and Band), who all contribute to the sketch development (the band being the last to join this process in 2017). Science Revue is also one of the few revues to consistently use the York Theatre, the largest theatre available at the Seymour Centre.

Band Revue 
In the wake of the success of the Science Revue band in 2019, members of the production and others created Band Revue as part of the Sydney University Dramatic Society (SUDS) 'Summer Slots,' running off the limited budget provided by SUDS. Marketed as a "Science Revue Fundraiser", it received positive reviews for its 3 night run, but currently is not a standalone Revue.

Identity Revues

POC Revue 
POC (People of Colour) Revue debuted in 2015, under the name ACAR Revue (Autonomous Collective Against Racism), as a response to the lack of POC cast and crew in other revues at the time. The 2015 production was described as a "test run" given its unorthodox venue and rushed production. The Revue was rebranded as POC Revue from 2017 onwards.

Womn's Revue 
Womn's Revue debuted in 2007 as "Women's Revue", returning in 2009, and then going on Hiatus until it was reestablished in 2015 as "Wom*n's Revue". From 2017 the show has been titled "Womn's Revue". The show is described as specifically "written, directed, performed and produced by those who identify as, or have lived experience as womn!"

List of Performances 

† ACAR Revue was renamed to POC Revue in 2017.

†† Band Revue is technically an event made by the Science Revue

External links
University of Sydney Union Revues Information Page
The Science Revue website

References 

Student societies in Australia
University of Sydney
Australian student comedy